Malungon, officially the Municipality of Malungon, is a 1st class municipality in the province of Sarangani, Philippines. According to the 2020 census, it has a population of 105,465 people.

Malungon is a landlocked town at the north-eastern part of Sarangani. It is bounded on the west by Tupi, South Cotabato, on the north by the province of Davao del Sur, east by Malita, capital of the newly created province of Davao Occidental, on the south by Alabel (the provincial capital) and General Santos, and on the south-west by Polomolok, South Cotabato.

Geography

Barangays
Malungon is politically subdivided into 31 barangays.

Climate

Demographics

Economy

Malungon's economy is largely based on agriculture with a high level production of dried coconut meat. Animal husbandry is the second biggest income earner, notably cattle farming. Other agricultural products are coconuts, maize, sugarcane, bananas, pineapples, mangoes, pork, eggs, beef, and fish.

The economy has accelerated in the past decade driven by advances in global communication technology and the finishing of a modern highway that tremendously improved trade and transport.

References

External links
Malungon Profile at PhilAtlas.com
  Malungon Profile at the DTI Cities and Municipalities Competitive Index
Malungon Municipal Profile at the Province of Sarangani Official Website
[ Philippine Standard Geographic Code]
Philippine Census Information
Local Governance Performance Management System

Municipalities of Sarangani